Will is a 1981 American drama film directed by Jessie Maple. It was the first independent feature-length film directed by an African-American woman. The movie was filmed on location in Harlem with a budget of $12,000 and featured an as-yet unknown actress, Loretta Devine, in her first film role. In 2013, the film was restored by the New York Women in Film and Television's Women's Film Preservation Fund.

Plot
Will is a girls' basketball coach, who is battling his heroin addiction while raising a 12-year-old adopted boy (called "Little Brother") with his wife (Loretta Devine). The film includes graphic depictions of drug use, including a scene where Little Brother snorts cocaine, and portrays the effect of drugs on individuals, their families, and their communities as well as the positive results of overcoming addiction.

Casting
Obaka Adedunyo earned his first film credit in the lead role of Will. Loretta Devine, an aspiring actress at that time, was rehearsing for the Broadway opening of Dreamgirls when she was cast as Will's wife. Devine, in her first film role, was paid $500.

References

External links

American independent films
African-American drama films
1981 films
1981 drama films
1980s American films